CAT-1 (also Technological Capsule 1, also Obélix) was the first artificial Earth satellite launched by the European Space Agency on their own rocket, the Ariane 1. It was only intended to provide data on the launch characteristics of the new rocket and was only powered for 8 orbits.

References

External links

Image of satellite

European Space Agency satellites
First artificial satellites of a country
Satellites formerly orbiting Earth
Spacecraft launched in 1979